Solenostemon is a former genus of flowering plants in the family Lamiaceae. It has been included in the genus Plectranthus, but is now included in an expanded Coleus. They are native to tropical Africa, Asia and Australia. Some species formerly placed in this genus are cultivated for their highly variegated leaves.

Former species
Some species formerly placed in the genus are:
Solenostemon autranii (Briq.) J.K.Morton, now Coleus autranii, syn. Plectranthus autranii
Solenostemon rotundifolius, now Coleus rotundifolius, syn. Plectranthus rotundifolius
Solenostemon scutellarioides (L.) Codd, now Coleus scutellarioides, syns. Coleus blumei, Plectranthus scutellarioides
Solenostemon shirensis (Gürke) Codd, now Coleus shirensi

References

External links
Annotated Checklist of Cultivated Plants of Hawai‘i: Solenostemon
USDA Germplasm Resources Information Network (GRIN): Species Records of Solenostemon

Lamiaceae
Lamiaceae genera
Historically recognized angiosperm genera
Garden plants of Asia
Garden plants of Africa